Volkonsky is a Russian language locational surname, named after the Volkona river south of Moscow, and borne by a Russian noble family. Alternative spellings include Volkonskaya, Volkonski and Wolkonsky. The name Volkonsky may refer to:

Alexander Volkonsky (1866–1934), Russian diplomat
Alexey Volkonsky (born 1978), Russian canoer
Andrei Volkonsky (1933–2008), Russian composer 
Maria Mikhailovich Volkonskaya (1863–1943), Russian aristocrat
Maria Volkonsky (1805–1863), Russian aristocrat
Nikita Volkonsky (1781–1844), Russian general 
Peeter Volkonski (born 1954), Estonian musician
Peter Volkonsky (1861–1948), Russian aristocrat
Pyotr Mikhailovich Volkonsky (1776–1852), Russian general
Serge Wolkonsky (1860–1937), Russian theatre director
Sergei Volkonsky (1788–1865), Russian general 
Zinaida Volkonskaya (1792–1862), Russian writer

References

Russian-language surnames
Russian noble families
Volkonsky family